The Theological University of Apeldoorn (TUA) is the Dutch theological university of the Christian Reformed Churches (Christelijke Gereformeerde Kerken). More than 130 students study at the university in Apeldoorn. The theological course lasts six years. The student is in the bachelor's program for the first three years. This has a more orientating character, and includes the languages Classic Greek and Koine Greek, Latin and Biblical Hebrew. In the three-year master's program that follows, further studies and specialization are discussed. The training is specifically aimed at educating pastors (for the Christian Reformed Churches). Furthermore, one tries to keep together the reformed character of the faith and the church and the scientific level of the university. The syllabus consists of subjects such as ethics, apologetics, Old and New Testament, canonical studies, dogmatics, church history, church law and civil subjects.

Although the university is mainly a preacher training for the Christian Reformed Churches, a minority of them become preachers or preachers within this church federation. In addition to students from the Netherlands, there are also students from outside the Netherlands, especially from Korea, Indonesia and other countries in Asia.

There is also close contact and cooperation with the university of the Reformed Churches (Liberated) (Gereformeerde Kerken Vrijgemaakt) in Kampen. By integrating their research programs, the theological universities of Apeldoorn and Kampen are able to present a combined tradition of more than two centuries of classical theology. Their research program is a daring initiative to combine two fields of research that are all too often kept strictly separated: Biblical Exegesis and Systematic Theology (BEST).

The university is one of the few universities in the Netherlands where truly reformed theology is being taught.

Small history
 At the first Synod of the Christian Reformed Churches in 1894 eight congregations were represented. This synod has opened a Theological Seminary in The Hague. 
 In 1919 the university moved to Apeldoorn.
 Since 1968 the university has been open to those who do not seek training for the ministry in the Christian Reformed Churches of the Netherlands, but who have a desire to study theology for other aims.
 During the last two decades many international contacts with the university have been established and are still increasing. As a result, every year some students from outside the Netherlands study in TUA.
 Since 1980 the university has been allowed to grant a doctor's degree (Th.D.) in theology.
 The Theological University of Apeldoorn and the Puritan Reformed Theological Seminary in Grand Rapids are jointly starting a Puritan research center in 2017 and setting up an associated combined doctoral program.

Professors and Associate Professor

Professors:
 prof. dr. Arnold Huijgen
 prof. dr. Maarten Kater
 prof. dr. Bram de Muynck
 prof. dr. Eric Peels
 prof. dr. Herman Selderhuis
prof. dr. Marten van Willigen

Emeritus Professors:
 prof. dr. Arie Baars
 prof. dr. Gerard den Hertog 
 prof. dr. Teus Hofman
 prof. dr. Johannes Willem Maris
 prof. dr. Willem van 't Spijker
 prof. dr. Willem Velema

Former teachers and professors 
The years of service as teacher or professor are stated in brackets.
 Frederik Philip Louis Constant van Lingen (1894-1909)
 Jacobus Wisse (1894-1902)
 Pieter Johannes Marie de Bruin (1905-1938)
 Adam van der Heijden (1909-1927)
 Hector Janssen (1909-1919)
 Franciscus Lengkeek (1914-1932)
 Jacob Jan van der Schuit (1922-1953)
 Gerard Wisse (1921-1946)
 Jan Willem Geels (1932-1947)
 Leendert Huibert van der Meiden (1938-1953)
 Jan Hovius (1947-1972)
 dr. Jan van Genderen (1954-1993)
 dr. Berend Jakob Oosterhoff (1954-1987)
 Willem Kremer (1954-1969)
 dr. Willem Hendrik Velema (1966-1996)
 dr. Johannes Pieter Versteeg (1968-1987)
 dr. Jacobus de Vuyst (1988-1997)

References

Website
 

Reformed church seminaries and theological colleges
Theological University of Apeldoorn